The men's beach volleyball tournament at the 1998 Asian Games was held from December 16 to December 19, 1998 in Jomtien Beach, Chonburi Province.

Schedule
All times are Indochina Time (UTC+07:00)

Results

Double elimination round

Round 1

Round 2

Rank 9

Round 3

Rank 7

Rank 5

Knockout round

Semifinals

Bronze medal match

Gold medal match

Final standing

References

Results

External links
Official website

Beach Men